Qeshlaq-e Mehrchin (also Romanized as Qeshlāq-e Mehrchīn; also known as Qeshlāq) is a village in Juqin Rural District, in the Central District of Shahriar County, Tehran Province, Iran. At the 2006 census, its population was 140, in 29 families.

References 

Populated places in Shahriar County